Touroud can refer to 

 The Dervish Touroud, a character in Osman's Dream
 Touroud or Torud, village in Iran